Phil Foster (born Fivel Feldman; March 29, 1913 – July 8, 1985) was an American actor and performer, best known for his portrayal of Frank DeFazio in Laverne & Shirley.

Early life 
Foster was born Fivel Feldman in Brooklyn, New York City on March 29, 1913.

Career 
Foster took his stage name from Foster Avenue in Brooklyn. His first taste of performing came as a child, when he and his friends began singing and dancing in front of movie theaters. He then began appearing in amateur shows, competing for prizes. With him on occasion was another beginner named Jackie Gleason.

At the height of the Great Depression, Foster started in the dramatic field, playing in halls, back rooms and wherever possible during a period when theaters weren't available. "We did all sorts of plays, including all of Clifford Odets' early works — for $28 to $35 a week, living three in a room eating — if there was any food around", he recalled.

Foster made his debut as a nightclub comic in Chicago in the late 1930s when he was pushed out on the floor suddenly to fill in for a stand-up comic. "I just got up and talked", he says. "I didn't know you were supposed to have an act. But I was offered the job at $125 a week."

Foster always intended to go back to acting, but, staying with the money, Foster rapidly made a reputation in nightclubs and found himself in constant demand across the country.

Post-war 
During World War II, Foster served in the United States Army. Upon his discharge, he returned to New York and became a variety-show favorite with an act comprising stories based on his curious childhood in Brooklyn.

During the 1950s, Foster made several comedy short subjects for Universal-International as "Brooklyn's Ambassador to the World". Because of his popularity, he was chosen by George Pal as one of the military space crewmen on a trip to Mars in Conquest of Space.

It was Garry Marshall, an old friend whom he helped get started as a comedy writer for Joey Bishop and other entertainers, who lured Foster again to Hollywood, first to appear in The Odd Couple and then to co-star in Laverne & Shirley, at which time he was living in Fort Lee, New Jersey.

Among Foster's other television appearances were guest-starring roles in Ten-Four Productions' telefilm The Great American Traffic Jam and NBC's $weepstake$ and Games People Play. He made several return visits to The Ed Sullivan Show and Toast of the Town along with This Is Show Business, The Tonight Show Starring Johnny Carson, The Love Boat and The Patty Duke Show. He also worked in film, notably Bang the Drum Slowly. He also recorded a handful of live stand-up comedy albums.

Demonstrating his versatility, Foster embarked upon a literary career and completed a play and two story outlines. In addition to his club work, acting and writing talents, he also ran a workshop for young actor-comedians called the Foster Children. "They have new, fresh ideas and I love helping them get started", he said. "The only thing I ask in return is that when these youngsters are established, they help others on their way."

Personal life and death 
Foster had two sons – Michael and Danny.

Foster died of a heart attack in Rancho Mirage, California, on July 8, 1985, at the age of 72.

Filmography 
 Conquest of Space (1955) – Jackie Siegle
 The Patsy (1964) – Mayo Sloan
 Hail (1972) – Michael Moloney
 Every Little Crook and Nanny (1972) – Police Lt. Bozzaris
 Bang the Drum Slowly (1973) – Joe Jaros
 Jacqueline Susann's Once Is Not Enough (1975) – Cab Driver
 The Happy Hooker Goes to Washington (1977) – Senator Krause
 Texas Godfather (1985) – Ralph Salerno (final film role)
 ''Fantasy Island – TV serial, ep. "The Over-the Hill Caper/Poof!You're a Movie Star (1978)

References

External links 
 
 
 

1913 births
1985 deaths
American male television actors
People from Brooklyn
People from Fort Lee, New Jersey
Jewish American male actors
20th-century American male actors
Burials at Eden Memorial Park Cemetery
20th-century American Jews